The Times is a weekly newspaper published in Brownsville, Oregon, United States. It was established in 1888 by Albert B. Cavender and A. S. McDonald, who built up a circulation of 700 in the paper's first two years. Today it has a circulation of 719.

References

External links 
 The Times (official website)

Brownsville, Oregon
Newspapers published in Oregon
Oregon Newspaper Publishers Association
Publications established in 1888
Weekly newspapers published in the United States

1888 establishments in Oregon